Pacific Motorway  may refer to:

 Pacific Motorway (Brisbane–Brunswick Heads), Pacific Motorway from Brisbane, Queensland, to Brunswick Heads in northern NSW
 Pacific Motorway (Sydney–Newcastle), Pacific Motorway from Sydney to Newcastle

See also
 Pacific Highway (Australia)